Sean Hesketh (born ) is an Ireland international rugby league footballer who last played for Hunslet in Kingstone Press League 1.

He played at representative level for Ireland, and at club level for Hunslet.

Background
Hesketh was born in Pontefract, West Yorkshire, England.

Career
He has international appearances for Ireland in the 2010 Alitalia European Cup, 2012 2014 and 2015 European Cup tournaments.

References

1986 births
Living people
Batley Bulldogs players
Doncaster R.L.F.C. players
English people of Irish descent
English rugby league players
Featherstone Rovers players
Halifax R.L.F.C. players
Hunslet R.L.F.C. players
Ireland national rugby league team players
Keighley Cougars players
Oxford Rugby League players
Rugby league players from Pontefract
Rugby league props
York City Knights players